Back to Me  is the debut solo album by American singer-songwriter Howie Dorough, who is known for being a member of the Backstreet Boys. The album was released on November 9, 2011, in Japan and November 15, 2011, in the United States.

Background and recording
Back to Me was recorded with a multitude of songwriters and producers. Production on the album began in 2002 following the Backstreet Boys' initial hiatus, but when the group later re-united in 2004, the project was shelved. Following the band's revival, Dorough continued working on the album in his spare time, and in 2008, made an official announcement regarding the album. Dorough initially started off with a Latin sound in mind, exploring his heritage and roots. Following the band's sixth album, This is Us, Dorough returned to the studio and completed the project, finally changing the direction of the genre to pop-dance.

Recording for the album began in 2002, following the Backstreet Boys' initial hiatus. Dorough initially envisaged the album as having a Latin sound, as he wanted to get as far away from the Backstreet Boys' sound as possible. He recorded around eight demo tracks at this point, but when the band reformed in 2004, Dorough shelved the project. He again revisited it in 2008, working on the demos he had previously written as well as new material. It was not until the conclusion of the band's 2010 world tour that Dorough found he had enough time in his grueling schedule to fully commit to the album. With AJ McLean also working on a solo project in Japan at the time, Dorough was encouraged by his bandmate to approach Avex Group, who, impressed with the sales of McLean's solo project in the region, later signed Dorough as well. At this point, Dorough returned to the studio, where he decided to change the direction of the album from the unfamiliar Latin to the popular pop-dance genre which worked well for McLean. As well as collaborating with a number of new producers and songwriters, Dorough re-worked some of his Latin demos, changing the lyrics and composition to suit the style of the album.

Dorough recorded an unreleased Backstreet Boys song which he had co-written with Nick Carter, called "Pure", which they had been unable to complete for inclusion on the This Is Us album. He also worked with Wayne Rodrigues on a number of songs, and also co-wrote with Jodi Marr.

Promotion and release
The album's lead single, "100", was released to success in Japan, with a promotional tour and a number of live dates to follow. As such, Dorough was asked to record exclusive material for the Japanese market only as a reward to the fans, and as such, he joined with singer and entertainer Yu Shirota, whom he had discovered whilst searching YouTube for popular Japanese artists. The pair soon came together in the recording studio to record a song specially written by Dorough, called "If I Say". The Japanese deluxe edition of the album includes a bonus DVD which features footage of the pair recording the song. The album was subsequently released in the United States by HowieDolt music, and was later released in Germany the following year. The German edition also includes a bonus track, called "Over and Under".

Track listing

Personnel
 Adam Anders – programming 
 Peer Åström – programming 
 Jerrod "SKINS" Bettis – engineer 
 Chris Birgersen – programming 
 Deyder Cintron – engineer 
 Dakari – engineer 
 Chris DeStefano – programming, arrangements, musician, background vocals, and engineer 
 Christian Dwiggins – engineer , mixing 
 Jorge Gonzalez – engineering 
 Jed Harper – musician 
 Daniel James – engineer 
 Kid Famous – guest rapper 
 Kuya – musicians 
 Dwayne Larring – guitars 
 Kasia Livingston – background vocals 
 Tony Maserati – mixing 
 Bo Christian Nilsson – mixing 
 Devin "DLP" Parker – keyboards 
 Tom Polce – mixing 
 Zac Poor – background vocals 
 Andrea Remanda – background vocals 
 Wayne Rodrigues – keyboards, drum programming, and Protools editing 
 Beau Valais – engineer and mixing

Charts

References

2011 debut albums
Avex Group albums
Albums produced by the Inkredibles